Goldsmith C. Gilbert Historic District is a national historic district located at Muncie, Delaware County, Indiana. It encompasses 75 contributing buildings and is located in the oldest residential section of Muncie.  The district includes notable examples of Late Victorian, Colonial Revival, and Bungalow / American Craftsman style architecture.  Located in the district is the separately listed J.C. Johnson House.  Other notable buildings include the A.L. Johnson House, Meeks Mortuary Building, Joseph Hummel House, and Miller Livery (1916).

It was added to the National Register of Historic Places in 1988.

References

External links

Historic districts on the National Register of Historic Places in Indiana
Colonial Revival architecture in Indiana
Victorian architecture in Indiana
Historic districts in Muncie, Indiana
National Register of Historic Places in Muncie, Indiana